Alexander Cameron (June 22, 1827 – May 15, 1893), known as the "Earl of Essex", was an Irish-born Canadian businessperson and lawyer who began the town of Essex and owned much of the land around Windsor, Ontario and Essex County in the late 19th century.

The son of Allan Cameron, a British soldier, he came to Amherstburg, Upper Canada with his father and grew up there. Cameron was educated at Upper Canada College, articled in law in Toronto and was called to the bar in 1853, setting up practice in Toronto and Windsor. He was married twice: to Calcina Medora, the daughter of Andrew Norton Buell, in 1853; and to Catharine Ward (née Lyon) in 1878.

Early in his life Cameron sought a career in politics, but after a bitter election and accusation of corruption in 1854, Cameron's interest in politics came to an end.  Cameron then bought a great deal of land in Essex County and was forced to borrow money from his father-in-law to pay the mortgage when the land value did not increase.  Cameron also leased Talbot road in Essex County after the municipality sought to lease main roads to toll companies.  In the 1870s Cameron's business dealings finally became profitable.  He bought land in Essex County that was adjacent to railways and becoming increasingly valuable.

In the 1880s Cameron developed land in Windsor, Ontario along with John Curry; as well as practising law with Francis Cleary and R. F. Sutherland.

References

1827 births
1893 deaths
Businesspeople from Ontario
Canadian city founders
People from Essex County, Ontario